Brett Alan Riley (born October 26, 1970) is an American writer and college professor. 

Riley was born in Topeka, Kansas, during his father's service in the United States Air Force. His family lived briefly in Austin, Texas, before moving to Crossett, Arkansas. Except for a two-year period spent in Gloster, Mississippi, and a one-year matriculation at Louisiana Tech University, Riley lived in Crossett until the age of twenty-eight. He has since lived in Baton Rouge, Louisiana; Tuscaloosa, Alabama; and Las Vegas, Nevada.

In 1994, Riley earned a BA in English from the University of Arkansas-Monticello. He completed his MA at the University of Louisiana-Monroe in 1997 and his PhD in Contemporary American Fiction and Film in 2006.

Since 1995, Riley has worked in higher education. He taught at the University of Louisiana-Monroe (1995-1998), Louisiana State University (1998-2004, 2006), Baton Rouge Community College (2004-2006), and the University of Alabama (2006-2012). He currently teaches creative writing, American literature, and composition as a tenured professor at the College of Southern Nevada.

In 2013, Ink Brush Press published Riley's collection of linked short stories, The Subtle Dance of Impulse and Light.

In 2014, his screenplay, Candy's First Kiss, won the New York Screenplay Contest's grand prize in horror/sci-fi; third place overall at the London Film Awards Screenwriting Competition; the Gold Prize in horror at the Beverly Hills Screenplay Contest; and Honorable Mention at the WeScreenplay International Screenwriting Competition. This script also won the Grand Prize in horror at the 2015 Hollywood Screenplay Contest. This screenplay was adapted from his short story entitled "An Element of Blank," first published in The Evansville Review.

Riley's debut novel, Comanche: A Novel, was published by Imbrifex Books in September 2020. and was generally well received. A recording of his virtual book launch is online here.

Riley lives in Henderson, Nevada, with his wife and daughter. He has two other children, a son and a daughter, both of whom live in Arkansas. He has one granddaughter.

Publications 
Brett Riley has had dozens of short stories and essays published in various literary journals, magazines, and websites.

Books 
 The Subtle Dance of Impulse and Light,- published by Ink Brush Press (April 2013)  
 Comanche: A Novel— published by Imbrifex Books (September 2020)  
 Lord of Order: A Novel— forthcoming from Imbrifex Books (April 2021)  
 FREAKS: A Novel— forthcoming from Imbrifex Books (March 2022)

Screenplays 
 Candy's First Kiss

Creative Nonfiction 
 "My Resistance is Not the Same as Your Hate"–Published in Role Reboot (December 2016)
 "When White Privilege is a Matter of Life and Death"–Published in Role Reboot (July 2017)
 "Assault, Bigotry, and Self-Hatred: Not All Wounds Bleed"–Published in Role Reboot (August 2017)
 "Some Jokes Just Aren't Funny"–Published in Foliate Oak Literary Magazine
 "We Are All Las Vegas, But We Don't Have to Be"–Published in Role Reboot (October 2017)
 "Past, Present, Popcorn"–Published in Wild Violet Literary Magazine (November 2017)
 "Was This Trip Really Necessary?"–Published in Green Hills Literary Lantern
 "Why I Won't Be Watching the Roseanne Reboot"–Published in Role Reboot (April 2018)
 "The True Horror of Hereditary: Patriarchy"–Published in Role Reboot (June 2018)
 "Why You Need to See the Mister Rogers Documentary"–Published in Role Reboot (August 2018)
 "BlacKkKlansman and the American Past That's Still Present"–Published in Role Reboot (August 2018)
 "A Tale of Two Women: On Joan Jett and Dr. Christine Blasey Ford"–Published in Role Reboot (October 2018)
 "Halloween 2018: A Horror Film for the #TimesUp Era"–Role Reboot (October 2018)
 "Bohemian Rhapsody'''s Fumbling Representations of Sexuality]"–[http://rolereboot.org/ Role Reboot (November 2018)
 "Floating the Yacht"–Published in Rougarou: Journal of Arts & Literature (winter 2018)
 "Dumbo and Me"–Published in Literary Orphans "The Golden Globes: A Celebration of Diversity, Sort Of"–Published in Role Reboot (January 2019)
 "Gillette Is Right, Guys; We Can Get Better"–Published in Role Reboot (January 2019)
 "The 2019 Grammys: A Soundtrack for Change"–Published in Role Reboot (February 2019)
 "The 2019 Oscars: An Improved Show with a Few Huge Missteps"–Published in Role Reboot (February 2019)
 "Meeting a Familiar Enemy: Jordan Peele's Us"–Published in Role Reboot (March 2019)
 "The Best of Enemies: It's Still All about Whiteness"–Published in Role Reboot (April 2019)
 "Re-Reading Avengers #1-10 from a Contemporary Perspective"—Published in F(r)iction (September 2019)
 "Dreaming in Stereo"—Published in under the gum tree (October 2019)
 "Searching for Haunted Fiction in American Literature"-Published in Crime Reads (Sept. 1, 2020)

 Short fiction 
 "Golgotha"—Published in Big Muddy, an Interdisciplinary Journal of the Mississippi River Valley 9.1 (2009) pp. 59–66
 "Lost and Found"—Published in First Class 35.2 (2010) pp. 21–31
 "Doesn't Mean They're not Out to Get You"—Published in The Broadkill Review 4.4 (July/August 2010)
 "The Security System"—Published in The Broadkill Review 4.5 (September/October 2010) pp. 38–40
 "The Cat in the Backyard"—Published in Folio (fall 2010/spring 2011 issue) pp. 96–102
 "An Anecdote"—Published in The Broadkill Review 5.1 (January/February 2011) pp. 11–13
 "Dated"—Published in The Broadkill Review 5.2 (March/April 2011) pp. 25–27
 "A Transcript Found on My Hard Drive (I)"—Published in The Broadkill Review 5.3 (May/June 2011) pp. 63–64
 "Just Because You're Paranoid"—Published in The Broadkill Review 5.4 (July/August 2011) pp. 62–65
 "Old Shoes"—Published in Metal Scratches issue 13 (2011) pp. 1–7
 "Hook"—Published in Allegory 18.45 (spring/summer 2012)
 "A Face to Die For"—Published in Blue Lake Review (June 2012 update)
 "The Hair on His Cape"—Published in The Evansville Review Vol. XXII (2012) pp. 16–28
  "Hot Wheels for Jesus"—Published in Big Muddy, an Interdisciplinary Journal of the Mississippi River Valley, under the name Brendan West-Moreland, 12.1 (2012) pp. 184–193
 "Phone Tag"—Published in The Mochila Review Vol. 14 (2012) pp. 80–88
 "An Ending"—Published in Separate Worlds (January/February 2013) update, pp. 282–297
 "Doing It Like a Man"—Published in The Wisconsin Review 46.2 (2013) pp. 27–34
 "Fifth and Cedar"—Published in Red Rock Review 32 (fall 2013) pp. 37–43
 "An Element of Blank"—Published in The Evansville Review Vol. XXIII (2013) pp. 115–128
 "What Lies in Ambush"—Published inSolstice Literary Magazine (fall/winter 2015)
 "Orville's Song"—Published in Burlesque Press Variety Show (August 2015)
 "Hyacinth"—Published in The Broadkill Review 31 (October 2017 update)
 "An Element of Blank"—Published in Nth Degree (February 2018)
 "Summer Home"—Published in f(r)iction Vol. 11 (summer 2018) pp. 8–15
 "Everyone Here Comes from Somewhere Else"—Published in The Courtship of Winds (winter 2018)
 "Closed for Storm"—Published in The Baltimore Review (winter 2018)
 "Thy Rod and Thy Staff"—Published in West Trade Review Vol. 10 (spring 2019) pp. 140–155
 "Salvation is a Joke with No Punchline"—Published in Solstice Literary Magazine (spring 2019)
 "Far Away from the Path and a Little Bit Lost"—Published in Ghost Town "Mating Behaviors of Urban White Males in the Southern United States"—Published in Bluestem "Alien"—Published in The Barcelona Review (October 2019)
 "After We're Gone"–Madville Publishing's Runaway'' Anthology (2019-2020)

Notes

External links

Living people
1970 births
Writers from Topeka, Kansas
Louisiana Tech University alumni
University of Arkansas at Monticello alumni
University of Louisiana at Monroe alumni
University of Louisiana at Monroe faculty
Louisiana State University faculty
University of Alabama faculty
College of Southern Nevada
American male writers
21st-century American screenwriters
21st-century American male writers